Avegno  may refer to:

Places
Italy
Avegno, Liguria, a comune in the Province of Genova

Switzerland
Avegno, Switzerland, a former comune in the Canton of Ticino
Avegno Gordevio, a comune in the Canton of Ticino

People with the surname
Anggie Avegno (born 1996), Ecuadorian canoeist
Virginie Amélie Avegno Gautreau (1859–1915), American socialite